Patrick Jopp (born 8 January 1962) is a Swiss archer. He competed in the men's individual event at the 1980 Summer Olympics.

References

1962 births
Living people
Swiss male archers
Olympic archers of Switzerland
Archers at the 1980 Summer Olympics
Place of birth missing (living people)